Perambulation noun; 
is the act of walking around, surveying land, or touring. In English law, its historical meaning is to establish the bounds of a municipality by walking around it.

Perambulation may refer to:

 Beating the bounds, annual custom in England and Wales of walking the boundary of one's parish
 Perambulation in Massachusetts and New Hampshire, a similar practice, conducted once every seven years
 The perambulation of the boundary between New Hampshire and Vermont is a meeting between the attorneys general of those two states, held once every seven years at the boundary
 Perambulation of the Town Leat, medieval custom in Tiverton, Devon of following the town's water supply along the leat (watercourse) on foot to its source at Norwood Common

See also
 Perambulator (disambiguation)
 Royal forest § Great Perambulation and after

Walking